The Cathedral of St Andrew (often referred to as St Andrews Cathedral) is a ruined cathedral in St Andrews, Fife, Scotland. It was built in 1158 and became the centre of the Medieval Catholic Church in Scotland as the seat of the Archdiocese of St Andrews and the Bishops and Archbishops of St Andrews. It fell into disuse and ruin after Catholic mass was outlawed during the 16th-century Scottish Reformation. It is currently a monument in the custody of Historic Environment Scotland.

History

Founding and development 

The cathedral was founded to supply more accommodation than the older church of St. Regulus (St. Rule) afforded. This older church, located on what became the cathedral grounds, had been built in the Romanesque style. Today, there remains the square tower, 33 metres (108 feet) high, and the quire, of very diminutive proportions. On a plan of the town from about 1531, a chancel appears, and seals affixed to the city and college charters bear representations of other buildings attached. To the east is an even older religious site, the Church of St Mary on the Rock, the Culdee house that became a Collegiate Church.

Work began on the new cathedral in 1158 and continued for over a century. The west end was blown down in a storm and rebuilt between 1272 and 1279. The cathedral was finally completed in 1318 and featured a central tower and six turrets; of these remain two at the east and one of the two at the western extremity, rising to a height of 30 metres (100 feet). On the 5th of July it was consecrated in the presence of King Robert the Bruce, who, according to legend, rode up the aisle on his horse.

A fire partly destroyed the building in 1378; restoration and further embellishment were completed in 1440.

The cathedral was served by a community of Augustinian Canons, the St Andrews Cathedral Priory, which were successors to the Culdees of the Celtic church.

Greyfriar (Franciscan) and Blackfriar (Dominican) friars had properties in the town by the late 15th century and possibly as late as 1518.

Abandonment and ruin

In June 1559 during the Reformation, a Protestant mob incited by the preaching of John Knox ransacked the cathedral; the interior of the building was destroyed. The cathedral fell into decline following the attack and became a source of building material for the town. By 1561 it had been abandoned and left to fall into ruin.

At about the end of the sixteenth century the central tower apparently gave way, carrying with it the north wall. Afterwards large portions of the ruins were taken away for building purposes, and nothing was done to preserve them until 1826. Since then it has been tended with scrupulous care, an interesting feature being the cutting out of the ground-plan in the turf. The principal portions extant, partly Norman and partly Early Scottish, are the east and west gables, the greater part of the south wall of the nave and the west wall of the south transept.

At the end of the seventeenth century some of the priory buildings remained entire and considerable remains of others existed, but nearly all traces have now disappeared except portions of the priory wall and the archways, known as The Pends.

St Rule's Tower

St Rule's tower is located in the cathedral grounds but predates it, having served as the church of the priory up to the early 12th century.  The building was retained to allow worship to continue uninterrupted during the building of its much larger successor.  Originally, the tower and adjoining choir were part of the church built in the 11th century to house the relics of St Andrew.  The nave, with twin western turrets, and the apse of the church no longer stand.  The church's original appearance is illustrated in stylised form on some of the early seals of the cathedral priory.  Legend credits St Rule (also known as St Regulus) with bringing relics of St Andrew to the area from their original location at Patras in Greece.  Today the tower commands an admirable view of the town, harbour, sea, and surrounding countryside.  Built in grey sandstone ashlar, and (for its date) immensely tall (33 m), it is a land- and sea-mark seen from many miles away, its prominence doubtless meant to guide pilgrims to the place of the Apostle's relics.  In the Middle Ages a spire atop the tower made it even more prominent.  The tower was originally ascended using ladders between wooden floors, but a stone spiral staircase was inserted in the 18th century.

Burials

In the cathedral
Roger de Beaumont (bishop) (d. 1202)
William Wishart (d. 1279)
William de Lamberton (1328, on the north side of the high altar)
William Fraser (bishop of St Andrews) (1297, his heart was buried in the wall of the church by his successor, William de Lamberton)
William de Landallis (1385, in the church's vestry)
James Kennedy (bishop) (1465, in a magnificent tomb which he had caused to be built in St Salvator's Chapel, the ruins of which are still visible)
Andrew Forman (d. 1521)

Cathedral burial ground
 Very Rev John Adamson DD
 John Anderson, Principal of St Leonards College
 Rev Alexander Anderson (1676-1737) son of above
 Rev Prof George Buist DD
 Robert Chambers
 Rev Prof George Cook DD FRSE
 Rev Prof John Cook DD FRSE
 Rev Prof William Crawford DD father of Thomas Jackson Crawford
 Sir Robert Anstruther Dalyell
 Prof James Donaldson (classical scholar)
 Adam Ferguson
 Andrew Forman
 Rev Prof James Gillespie
 Rev Prof Thomas Gillespie, Professor of Humanity
 Robert Haldane (mathematician)
 Thomas Halyburton
 Matthew Forster Heddle
 George Hill (minister)
 Prof Henry David Hill
 Rev Prof James Hunter
 Prof Thomas Jackson FRSE
 David Miller Kay, military hero, author and missionary
 Prof Peter Redford Scott Lang, mathematician
 Rev Prof John McGill LLD, translator of the Old Testament
 Norman MacLeod (The Wicked Man)
 Young Tom Morris
 Old Tom Morris
 William Henry Murray
 Rev Francis Nicoll DD Principal of St Salvator's College, St Andrews
 Hugh Lyon Playfair
 Rev James Playfair (minister) (memorial only)
 Lt Col Sir Robert Lambert Playfair LLD, soldier and author
 Prof Alexander Roberts
 Allan Robertson
 Rev Professor Daniel Robertson DD (1755-1817)
 Rev Prof Samuel Rutherford
 Saint Andrew (partial remains)
 Very Rev Robert Small (1732-1808) Moderator in 1791
 William Spalding (writer)
 Very Rev Prof Alexander Stewart DD Principal of St Andrews University in 1915, Moderator of the General Assembly of the Church of Scotland in 1911
 Rev Prof John Trotter
 Alexander Watson, Provost of St Andrews
 Major John and Lady Catherine Whyte-Melville (the large monument in the far corner of the churchyard)
 Prof William Wright (orientalist)

Eastern Cemetery
 Col Robert Hope Moncrieff Aitken, Victoria Cross recipient
Fr George Angus, first Roman Catholic priest in St. Andrews since the Reformation
 Warington Baden-Powell founder of the Sea Scouts
 Wilhelmina Barns-Graham
 Prof John Birrell
 Andrew Kennedy Hutchison Boyd
 Sir Napier Burnett
 Sir Guy Colin Campbell
 Reginald Fairlie
 William Lewis Ferdinand Fischer, FRS
 James Ross Gillespie, architect
 Sir James Heriot-Maitland
 Sir John Home
 Andrew Kirkaldy (golfer)
 Vice-Admiral Dashwood Fowler Moir, famed for his actions in the Battle of Jutland and who lost his life protecting the Atlantic Convoy
 Charles Metcalfe Ochterlony, 2nd baronet Ochterlony
 James Bell Pettigrew
 Lyon Playfair, Baron Playfair
 William Smoult Playfair
 Prof Thomas Purdie FRS
 Andrew Maitland Ramsay LLD FRSE
 Prof David George Ritchie
 Prof John Tulloch
 Charles Wordsworth

See also
 St Andrews Cathedral Priory
 St Andrews Sarcophagus
 The Way of St Andrews

References

External links

La Catedral de San Andrés, Escocia [Saint Andrews Cathedral, Scotland]

Buildings and structures completed in 1318
12th-century church buildings in Scotland
Listed monasteries in Scotland
St. Andrew, St. Andrews
Listed cathedrals in Scotland
Churches in Fife
St Andrews
Romanesque architecture in Scotland
Museums in Fife
Former Roman Catholic churches in Scotland
Scheduled Ancient Monuments in Fife
Religious museums in Scotland
Category A listed buildings in Fife
1158 establishments in Scotland
Ruins in Fife
1561 disestablishments in Scotland